La Grasa de las Capitales is the second album by the Argentine Rock supergroup Serú Girán, released in 1979. After its deeply criticized debut album Serú Girán, the band went in search for a different sound, one that could be closer to the fans' expectations. They grew distant from symphonic rock and became closer to traditional rock and pop while keeping a considerable jazz fusion element in the music, which also was present in the debut album, and to a lesser extent some progressive rock along the way.

The word "grasa" means "grease" in Spanish, but in Argentina it is also slang for "tacky". As such, the title of the album was a criticism of the superficiality of Argentine society at the time (which was living under a military dictatorship following the 1976 coup) among other aspects what it was considered then "commercial" music (as opposed to the more elaborate lyrics and musicianship supposedly present in genres such as prog-rock) with disco music being parodied in the self-titled first track. The cover of the album is a spoof of popular gossip Gente magazine, with members of the band presented as improbable celebrities (Aznar an obscure office worker, Moro a butcher, Lebon a rugbier and Garcia a petrol station worker - a criticism to petrol companies who "stuff themselves with money and run the world" according to Garcia) one of the headlines announcing a romance between Aznar and "Olivia Neutron-Bomb" (cf Olivia-Newton John, the star of that year's blockbuster musical "Grease").

The album spurred three hit singles. Pedro Aznar's "Paranoia y Soledad" (Paranoia and Loneliness) which was a cryptically metaphoric song talking about a man's descent into insanity; "La Grasa de Las Capitales" (The Grease/Tackiness of the Capitals) which presented a sharp criticism on the paparazzi and the frivolous magazines (as showed on the sarcastic album cover) and briefly parodied disco music, and the final track, "Viernes, 3 A.M." (Friday, 3:00am) which had lyrics graphically depicting a man's suicide.

In 2007, the Argentine edition of Rolling Stone ranked it 17 on its list of "The 100 Greatest Albums of National Rock".

Track listing
All songs written and composed by Charly García, except where noted.
Side one
"La Grasa de las Capitales" (Grease of the Capitals) - 4:37
"San Francisco y el Lobo" (Saint Francis & the Wolf)  (David Lebón, Charly García) - 2:23
"Perro Andaluz" (Andalusian Dog/Un chien andalou) - 4:59
"Frecuencia Modulada" (Modulated Frequency/FM) (Charly García, David Lebón) - 3:20
"Paranoia y Soledad" (Paranoia and Loneliness) (Pedro Aznar) - 6:52
Side two
"Noche de Perros" (Dog's Night) (David Lebón, Charly García) - 6:34
"Viernes, 3 A.M." (Friday, 3 A.M.) - 4:18
"Los Sobrevivientes" (The Survivors) - 3:51
"Canción de Hollywood" (Song of Hollywood) - 4:54

Personnel
Charly García – Fender Rhodes electric piano, Yamaha CP-70, Minimoog synthesizer, mellotron, lead vocal, Moog Bass in "Los Sobrevivientes"
David Lebón - electric guitar, acoustic guitar, lead vocal
Pedro Aznar - bass guitar, fretless bass, synthesizers Minimoog, acoustic guitar, lead vocal, tubular bells on "Paranoia y Soledad"
Oscar Moro - drums, percussion

References

1979 albums
Serú Girán albums